Leinster versus Munster is, according to some Irish commentators, one of the biggest provincial rivalries in world rugby, which dates back to 1879, the year of founding of the provincial sides. Games between the two have occurred on an annual basis since the inception of the Irish inter-provincial championship in 1946. Since the beginning of the inter-provincials in 1946, Leinster hold a 60–44 advantage in overall wins, with five draws. Additionally, since the inception of the Celtic League in the 2001–02 season, Leinster hold a 33–17 advantage in overall wins, with one draw in that time.

The fierce rivalry has grown since the turn of professionalism as both teams battled for domestic and European dominance, and has sometimes become a heated and bitter affair, on and off the pitch. The rivalry is heightened by the fact that Leinster and Munster have been among the stronger provinces in Irish rugby, and among the strongest teams in European competition.

The birth of the modern era rivalry could be attributed to the Heineken Cup semi-final in 2006, when Munster defeated Leinster 30–6 in Lansdowne Road en route to winning their first European Championship. Munster then went on to enjoy a period of success by again winning the European trophy in 2008. A shift in fortunes occurred in 2009 however, when Leinster defeated Munster 25–6 at the same stage of the competition in front of 82,208 spectators at Croke Park, which was a world record attendance for a club game; Leinster went on in 2009 to claim the first of four European titles to Munster's two. The matches between the two teams regularly sells out their stadiums.

In addition to European competition, the two sides regularly face each other in the United Rugby Championship. Leinster and Munster have consistently been among the strongest teams in that tournament, with Leinster reaching twelve finals winning seven, and Munster reaching seven finals winning three. They have finished top two in the Pro14 championship three times — with Leinster defeating Munster 24–20 in 2002, Munster winning 19–9 in the 2011 final and Leinster defeating Munster 16–6 in the 2021 final.

Summary of Games Since 1946

Statistics

Biggest win

Leinster: 32–0 (1958–59)

Munster: 30–6 (2005–06)

Highest scoring match

Leinster 40–45 Munster (85 points, 1996–97)

Lowest scoring match

Munster 0–0 Leinster (0 points, 1953–54)

Most consecutive wins

Leinster: 6 (2018–19 – 2020–21)

Munster: 3 (1989–90 – 1991–92, 1996–97 – 1998–99, 2004–05 – 2005–06)

Highest attendance

82,208 (Heineken Cup semi-final, Croke Park, May 2009)

Results

See also
IRFU Interprovincial Championship
History of rugby union matches between Leinster and Ulster
History of rugby union matches between Leinster and Connacht

References

Munster
Leinster
Rugby union rivalries in Ireland
United Rugby Championship